Patrick O Gorman (born August 3, 1934) is an American theatre, film and television actor.

Early life
Born in Visalia, California, Gorman spent eight years in the military and studied acting in Paris, France. While in Paris, he had a stint in the Cirque Medrano as a clown.

Career
He has a background in musical comedy performing in Judy Garland's act around the country and at the Palace Theatre (Broadway) in New York City. He also danced in the nightclub acts of Donald O'Connor, Sammy Davis Jr. and Jimmy Durante.

Appearances in film include the 1975 film Three Days of the Condor, 1986's In the Shadow of Kilimanjaro, 1993's war epic Gettysburg, 1995's Wild Bill, 1997's Rough Riders and his reprisal of the role of Confederate General John Bell Hood in the 2003 film Gods and Generals. In the 2019 film Avengers: Endgame, he was Chris Evans' body double in the role of an elderly Steve Rogers; Evans's face in prosthetics was later edited on. Gorman alluded to the role in an Instagram post.

Gorman's television credits include Masada, Renegade, Happy Days, MacGyver, The Drew Carey Show and a recurring guest-star roles on NCIS:LA and Sleepy Hollow. He also appeared in season one, episode two of Westworld.

In 2020, Gorman starred in the feature psychological thriller film Painter as the character Bill also known as The Gardener.

Personal life
Gorman is fascinated by Japanese culture, particularly swords and calligraphy.

Filmography

Film

Television

References

External links
 

American male actors
Living people
1934 births